Xiaogang station is a station on Line 8 of the Guangzhou Metro that started operation on 29December 2002. It is located under Changgang Road East in Haizhu District.

Before the extension to both lines 2 and 8 opened in September 2010, this station ran as part of Line 2 as a single line from Wanshengwei to Sanyuanli.

References

Railway stations in China opened in 2002
Guangzhou Metro stations in Haizhu District